Pycnarmon lactiferalis is a moth in the family Crambidae. It was described by Francis Walker in 1859. It is found in the Russian Far East, Japan, China, India and Taiwan.

The length of the forewings is about 10 mm.

References

Spilomelinae
Moths described in 1859
Moths of Asia
Taxa named by Francis Walker (entomologist)